Lieutenant Colonel George Rowland Stanley Baring, 3rd Earl of Cromer,  (28 July 1918 – 16 March 1991), styled Viscount Errington before 1953, was a British banker and diplomat. After serving during the Second World War, he was Governor of the Bank of England (1961–1966) and British Ambassador to the United States (1971–1974).

Early life and military career
A member of the Baring family and the eldest son of the 2nd Earl of Cromer and his wife Ruby Elliot-Murray-Kynynmound, he was educated at Eton and Trinity College, Cambridge, where he left after a year. He served with the Grenadier Guards during the Second World War, where he gained the rank of Lieutenant-Colonel and became a Member of the Order of the British Empire.

Banking and diplomatic career
After serving as private secretary to Freeman Freeman-Thomas, 1st Marquess of Willingdon in 1938, he joined Barings Bank, founded by his ancestor Sir Francis Baring, as a clerk. After military service during the war, he was managing director of Barings between 1949 and 1959. He then served as Economic Minister at the British Embassy in Washington as well as holding executive directorships at the International Monetary Fund, the International Bank for Reconstruction and Development, and the International Finance Corporation.

He was appointed Governor of the Bank of England in 1961, a position he held until 1966. During his governorship he clashed with the incoming Labour Prime Minister Harold Wilson, over Cromer's desire to see government spending contained, which may have contributed to his decision not to seek a second term. Cromer was subsequently appointed to the Privy Council. He was responsible for the Cromer Report into Lloyd's of London.

From 1971 to 1974 he served as British Ambassador to the United States. Following his appointment he became a Knight Commander of the Order of St Michael and St George, and was raised to the rank of Knight Grand Cross in 1974. He was a Governor of the pro-NATO Atlantic Institute and a member of the Pilgrims Society executive committee.

In 1977, he was made a Knight of the Garter.

Personal life
Cromer married Hon. Esme Mary Gabriel Harmsworth (1922–2011) in 1942, daughter of Esmond Harmsworth, 2nd Viscount Rothermere.

They had three children:
 Lady Lana Mary Gabriel (1943–1974)
 Evelyn Rowland Esmond (born 1946), who succeeded as 4th Earl of Cromer
 Hon. Vivian John Rowland (born 1950), married his second cousin Lavinia Baring.

Both the Countess of Cromer and her daughter-in-law were royal attendants. Esme Harmsworth was a Lady of the Bedchamber to Queen Elizabeth II, while Lavinia Baring was a Lady-in-Waiting to Diana, Princess of Wales.

In 1964, during the period he was at the Bank of England, Cromer purchased a Fairey Huntsman 28 sports cruiser from Fairey Marine, Hamble. Bearing the name Le Reve, the vessel was taken to France. The boat still exists, and details can be seen on the Fairey Owners Club website.

The 3rd Earl died on 16 March 1991 in London. Esme remarried in 1993 to Gerrit van der Woude.

Footnotes

References

External links

1918 births
1991 deaths
People educated at Eton College
Alumni of Trinity College, Cambridge
Ambassadors of the United Kingdom to the United States
British bankers
Members of the Privy Council of the United Kingdom
Grenadier Guards officers
British Army personnel of World War II
English Anglicans
Earls in the Peerage of the United Kingdom
Knights of the Garter
Knights Grand Cross of the Order of St Michael and St George
Members of the Order of the British Empire
Pages of Honour
Diplomatic peers
Governors of the Bank of England
Rowland
World Bank Group people
20th-century English businesspeople